Gianni Torboli (born 25 December 1949) is a sailor from Riva del Garda, Italy. who represented his country at the 1996 Summer Olympics in Savannah, United States as crew member in the Soling. With helmsman Mario Celon and fellow crew member Claudio Celon they took the 10th place.

References

Living people
1949 births
Sailors at the 1996 Summer Olympics – Soling
Olympic sailors of Italy
People from Riva del Garda
Italian male sailors (sport)
Sportspeople from Trentino